Acrobasis atelogramma is a species of snout moth in the genus Acrobasis. It was described by Edward Meyrick in 1937. It is found in India.

References

Moths described in 1937
Acrobasis
Moths of Asia